Willem Andriessen (Haarlem, October 25, 1887 – Amsterdam, March 29, 1964) was a Dutch pianist and composer. His compositional output was small due to the demands of performance and teaching, but he was nonetheless awarded a number of compositional prizes in Belgium and the Netherlands.

He was an uncle of Louis Andriessen and Jurriaan Andriessen, who followed in his footsteps as composers.

Biography
Andriessen studied at the Amsterdam Conservatory, completing his studies in 1906, and was awarded the school's Outstanding Achievement Prize for piano. He appeared frequently in concert performances in the Netherlands, and was noted for his interpretations of J.S. Bach, Mozart, Beethoven and Robert Schumann, though he also played piano pieces from contemporaries such as Debussy, Ravel, Bartók and Pijper.

Andriessen taught at the Royal Conservatory in The Hague (1910–18) and following this at the Muziekschool in Rotterdam after 1924. He was appointed director of the Amsterdam Conservatory from 1937 to 1953. He also gave radio broadcasts of performances which included analyses of compositions. In 1942, following the Nazi occupation of the Netherlands, Andriessen and his brother Hendrik were imprisoned for a year, during which time Willem gave lecture-concerts for the prisoners.

Works

Orchestral
Overture (1905)
Piano Concerto in Db (1908)
Scherzo, Hei, t'was in de Mei (1912, R/1956)

Choral
Mass (1914–16)
Sub tuum praesidium (1943, for male chorus)
Salve coeli digna (1944)
Ave Maria (1954, for female chorus)
Exsultate deo (1954)
Missa brevis (1963)

Solo vocal
4 liederen (1906)
Bruidsliederen (1909)
3 liederen (1909)
3 liederen (1911)
2 liederen (1913)

Solo piano
Sonata (1934)
Praeludia (1942–50)
Sonatine (1945)
Praeludium (1960, for the left hand)

Sources
Jos Wouters, Ronald Vermeulen. "Willem Andriessen". The New Grove Dictionary of Music and Musicians online.

1887 births
1964 deaths
20th-century classical composers
20th-century Dutch composers
Codarts University for the Arts alumni
Academic staff of the Conservatorium van Amsterdam
Dutch male classical composers
Dutch classical composers
Dutch music educators
Dutch pianists
People from Haarlem
Male pianists
20th-century Dutch pianists
20th-century Dutch male musicians